Jiga may refer to:
 a member of Analog Pussy
 Jiga, Iran